Sameer Abdulshaker (born 12 May 1960) is a Saudi footballer who played as a defender for Saudi Arabia in the 1984 Asian Cup.

References
Stats

1960 births
Living people
People from Medina
Saudi Arabian footballers
Saudi Arabia international footballers
Olympic footballers of Saudi Arabia
Footballers at the 1984 Summer Olympics
1984 AFC Asian Cup players
AFC Asian Cup-winning players
Asian Games medalists in football
Footballers at the 1982 Asian Games
Saudi Professional League players
Ohod Club players
Al-Wehda Club (Mecca) players
Asian Games bronze medalists for Saudi Arabia
Association football defenders
Medalists at the 1982 Asian Games
20th-century Saudi Arabian people